Two ships of the United States Navy have been named USS McCall for Edward McCall.

  was a modified  launched in 1910 and served in World War I. She served in the United States Coast Guard from 1924 to 1930. She was sold in 1934.
  was a  launched in 1937, served in World War II and was decommissioned in 1945.

United States Navy ship names